The Wasserfreunde Spandau 04  is a swimming club in Spandau, Berlin, Germany.

The club is known for the water polo team, which has won a record number of German championships with 37, as well as German Cups (31) and Super Cups (17). In European tournaments the team has won 4 LEN Champions Leagues and 2 LEN Super Cup titles. The club has over 3,500 members.

The word Wasserfreunde is German for "Water Friends".

Arena 
The team plays its home games in the Sportzentrum Schöneberg. For 2027, the team plans to move to the then newly constructed arena in Spandau.

Honours

European competitions
 LEN Champions League
 Winners (4): 1982–83, 1985–86, 1986–87, 1988–89
 Runners–up (4): 1980–81, 1981–82, 1987–88, 1989–90
 LEN Super Cup
 Winners (2): 1986, 1987
 Runners–up (1): 1983

Domestic competitions
 German League
 Winners (37): 1979, 1980, 1981, 1982, 1983, 1984, 1985, 1986, 1987, 1988, 1989, 1990, 1991, 1992, 1994, 1995, 1996, 1997, 1998, 1999, 2000, 2001, 2002, 2003, 2004, 2005, 2007, 2008, 2009, 2010, 2011, 2012, 2014, 2015, 2016, 2017, 2019
 German Cup
 Winners (31): 1979, 1980, 1981, 1982, 1983, 1984, 1985, 1986, 1987, 1990, 1991, 1992, 1994, 1995, 1996, 1997, 1999, 2000, 2001, 2002, 2004, 2005, 2006, 2007, 2008, 2009, 2011, 2012, 2014, 2015, 2020
 German Supercup
 Winners (17): 1979, 1980, 1981, 1982, 1983, 1984, 1985, 1997, 1999, 2001, 2002, 2003, 2014, 2015, 2016, 2021, 2022

Notable former members
Yusra Mardini, trained with Wasserfreunde Spandau 04 after moving to Berlin from Syria; she went on to represent the Refugee Olympic Team at Rio 2016 and Tokyo 2020.

References

External links
Homepage

Swim teams
Sport in Berlin
Water polo clubs in Germany
Sports clubs established in 1904
Spandau
Swimming clubs in Germany